Piers Holt Wilson (known as Peter; January 1883 – 3 February 1956) was an Anglican bishop in the mid part of the 20th century.

Early Years and Education
Wilson  was born in Redgrave Hall, Redgrave, Suffolk, England to George Holt Wilson and Lucinda James. After the death of his mother when he was 3 years old, he was brought up by his sister Evelyn. He was educated at Sherborne School and Oriel College, Oxford. After studying at Oxford, he taught in a Prep School for boys. He entered Wells Theological College situated in Wells after he was ordained in 1909. He was a curate in Kettering, a town in the northern part of Northamptonshire. He was one of 7 curates to the vicar the Reverend Patrick Smythe. He became priest-in-charge of All Saints St Andrews in 1920 and later rector in 1930. In 1940 he was appointed Dean of the Diocese of Saint Andrews, Dunkeld and Dunblane.

Bishop
On April 8, 1943, he was elected as Bishop of Moray, Ross and Caithness, succeeding Bishop Arthur Maclean. He was enthroned as bishop on 29 June 1943 by the Primus of the Scottish Episcopal Church the Most Reverend Logie Danson. Bishop Wilson retired as Bishop of Moray, Ross and Caithness in 1953. He settled back in St Andrews. He died in 1956.

WWI
As soon as World War I began in August 1914, Wilson enlisted. He served in the Royal Army Medical Corps from 1914 to 1915, first as a stretcher-bearer then later as a Chaplain in the disastrous Gallipoli Campaign of 1915. After serving with the Royal Army Medical Corps, Wilson entered the Royal Army Service Corps then, from 1916 to 1919, he served as a chaplain in the Royal Armed Forces. He was mentioned in dispatches and awarded the military O.B.E. for his part in evacuating people from an airfield in France. He received a letter signed by Winston Churchill.

Marriage
Wilson married the widow of his friend who had died during WWI in 1915. Wilson married Ella Lee in 1920 and went to live in St Andrews after he was appointed rector of All Saints by his former vicar and by then Dean of St Ninian's Cathedral in Perth, Patrick Smythe.

Notes

1883 births
People educated at Sherborne School
Alumni of Oriel College, Oxford
Deans of St Andrews, Dunkeld and Dunblane
20th-century Scottish Episcopalian bishops
Bishops of Moray, Ross and Caithness
1956 deaths
British Army personnel of World War I
Royal Army Medical Corps officers
Royal Army Service Corps officers
Royal Army Chaplains' Department officers